The Berlin Gate (Berliner Tor) is a largely vanished city gate in Potsdam, on the corner Türkstraße of Berliner Straße— it was originally at the end of Charlottenstrasse, but when the city wall was moved in 1752 the gate was rebuilt on its final site by Jan Bouman. It was badly damaged by bombing in 1945 and only one wing remains.

Buildings and structures in Potsdam